Windy is the nickname of:

 Richard Gale (British Army officer) (1896–1982), British Army general
 Windy McCall (born 1925), American former Major League Baseball relief pitcher John William McCall
 Tom O'Neill (ice hockey) (1923–1973), Canadian National Hockey League player
 Brian Windhorst (born 1978), American sportswriter
 Windy White, American college football player in the early 1920s

See also 

Lists of people by nickname